Juan Rodríguez Botas (1880–1917) is considered the first Canarian impressionist.

See also

 Tenerife#Painting.

References

External links
 Tenerife travel guide.

1880 births
1917 deaths
20th-century Spanish painters
20th-century Spanish male artists
Spanish male painters
Artists from the Canary Islands